Hockwold cum Wilton ("Hock/mallow wood and willow-tree farm/settlement") is 10 miles west of Thetford, Norfolk, England and is in the borough of King's Lynn and West Norfolk. It is located near several USAF airbases, notably RAF Lakenheath and RAF Mildenhall. It is situated on the boundary between the geographical areas of the Breckland – a region of sandy heathland now largely forested – and the flat, low-lying Fens, with some characteristics of both.

The village is the location of the primary campus of Iceni Academy. Previously this was Hockwold Primary School. The village has two churches (St Peter's, now redundant and cared for by the Churches Conservation Trust, and St James') and a Methodist chapel.

History

An important Roman hoard of silver tableware and coins was found in Hockwold in 1962. It is now part of the Roman-British collections at the British Museum. Originally, the village was located next to the river. However, after the Black Death infected the village, it was burnt down and relocated a mile to the north.

Hockwold Hall

Hockwold Hall is an Elizabethan house on the site of an earlier manor. The manor of Hockwold is mentioned in the Domesday Book of 1086. Hockwold Hall, with origins in the late 15th century, is a Tudor manor house with a substantial extension built by a Royal Prince at the end of the 19th century.

Sir John Tyndale (Tyndall), Baron Tyndale of Thetford, Governor of The Tower of London, KB (1475–1539) was born at Hockwold Cum Wilton Manor as was his son Sir Thomas Tyndale (Tyndall) 1505–1583, who also died there. Sir John's brother, William Tyndale (Tyndall) (1484–1536), a 16th-century scholar and linguist died a martyr for translating the scriptures from Greek and Hebrew into vernacular English so that commoners could read the Bible for themselves, rather than having to depend on the church hierarchy to interpret the official Latin Vulgate. The Tyndale Bible was the basis for the King James Bible and it survived book burners, but he did not. Tyndale was tied to a stake, strangled with a rope and torched outside a castle near Brussels on October 6th, 1536.

The royalist Arthur Heveningham lived at the Hall until 1657. His brother, William Heveningham, was one of the regicides of Charles I, and his daughter Abigail married John Digby, 1st Earl of Bristol. Sir Cyril Wyche, a founder member of the Royal Society, took over the estate in 1688 and lived there until 1707.  Prince Victor Duleep Singh, the eldest son of the last Maharaja of Lahore, a godson of Queen Victoria, came to live at Hockwold Hall in 1895.

Notes

External links

 Hockwold village website

Villages in Norfolk
King's Lynn and West Norfolk
Civil parishes in Norfolk